Xped Limited, formerly Raya Group, is an Internet of Things (IoT) company based in Adelaide, Australia. Its patented ADRC Technology provides a comprehensive IoT platform.

ADRC 
Auto Discovery Resource Control (ADRC) is an information system where resources, which may be attached to the Internet of Things, are described using Resource Modelling Language (RML) which allows them to be accessed by human users via a Device Browser app or by autonomous computers which may provide a device indexing and search function or by Artificial Intelligence (AI) agents or other inference engines.

Resources may be any type of device, appliance or software that has an API defined using Resource Control Protocol (RCP). RCP is a REST protocol that defines a limited number of operations that work on paths. An RCP path encodes the operation, attributes and data required to form a command that will be executed by the target resource. RCP is a text-based Application Layer Protocol that can be carried by many transport layers including IEEE 802.15.4, TCP/IP, UDP, SM-Bus and CAN-Bus.

Resources are managed by a Device Server which may manage resources that are implemented using multiple different communications technologies. Resources that do not natively implement the RCP protocol, are integrated into the ADRC system using an RML translation layer which is a software module that provides a protocol translation function between the foreign protocol and RCP. The RML translation layer is also responsible for providing an RML description for each of the supported devices of the foreign protocol.

Multiple resources that share a common location or local network form a Domain. Each domain is managed by a device server and resources may be associated with multiple domains if desired. A device server generally executes on a hardware gateway that exists at the edge of the Internet and a domain. Device servers respond to requests from device browsers which may be on the local network or across the Internet. Device servers also receive unsolicited signals from resources and relay them on to clients.

Device manufactures describe their device using RML which is normally embedded into the device at the time of manufacture; however RML may also be provided at a URL. When a device is on-boarded to a domain, the RML for the device is retrieved from the device by the device server. When a device browser is used to interact with a device, it fetches the RML from the device server and uses it to create the user interface presented to the user. A device may have one or more RML descriptions thus allowing for varied user experiences to be provided. As well as using RML to create the user interface, the device browser uses RML to construct the RCP commands that implement the device's API. Together, these capabilities enable devices to be fully described without the need for a standardized profile as is required by other systems including Zigbee, Z-Wave, Bluetooth, USB and others.

On-boarding of ADRC devices to a domain is achieved using Near Field Communications (NFC) where a smartphone with an device browser installed is tapped on the device and information identifying the device is displayed to the user who is asked to confirm the pairing. NFC is used as an out of band communication channel to exchange information securely between the device and device server so that a permanent long range communication channel can be established. NFC is also used to identify previously paired devices by tapping on the device which causes the device browser to jump to the device's information page which may also contain a URL to find further information.

See also
Xped will commence development of an ADRC IoT chip with Telink Semiconductor China.

Xped successfully embeds IoT control technology into Intel IoT Gateway Platform.

Xped has acquired JCT Healthcare a nurse call button technology company.

References

External links
Official site

Technology companies of Australia
Internet of things companies
Companies listed on the Australian Securities Exchange
Companies based in Adelaide